USS PC-558 was a  built for the United States Navy during World War II.

Career
PC-558 was laid down on 31 October 1941 by the Luders Marine Construction Co. in Stamford, Connecticut and launched on 13 September 1942. She was commissioned on 19 November 1942 and assigned to the Atlantic and Mediterranean theater of operations.

On 9 May 1944, PC-558 was patrolling the region north of Palermo, Sicily. After firing on the Neger with 20 mm and 40 mm cannon fire and dropping two depth charges, PC-558 successfully destroyed the vessel and captured the sole occupant, Oberfähnrich Walter Schulz. PC-558 was later joined by PC-626 and spotted another Neger. After another cannon and depth charge attack, the Neger was destroyed and the occupant was captured alive. PC-558 was later destroyed after being struck by a single torpedo fired by a German U-boat, . A nearby ship — PC-1235 — was fired at three times by the U-boat and all three torpedoes missed their target. PC-1235 drove off U-230 and returned to rescue the thirty surviving crewmembers of PC-558.

Notes

Sources
Submarine Chaser Photo Archive: PC-558
USS PC-558 (PC-558)
Paterson, Lawrence. Weapons of Desperation: German Frogmen and Midget Submarines of World War II, pgs. 21-22

 

PC-461-class submarine chasers
Ships built in Stamford, Connecticut
1942 ships
World War II patrol vessels of the United States
Maritime incidents in May 1944
Ships sunk by German submarines in World War II
World War II shipwrecks in the Mediterranean Sea